Nazi (also Romanized as Nāzī; also known as Nāzīyeh) is a village in Hamzehlu Rural District, in the Central District of Khomeyn County, Markazi Province, Iran. At the 2006 census, its population was 155, in 42 families.

References 

Populated places in Khomeyn County